The 14th Pan American Games were held in Santo Domingo, Dominican Republic from August 1 to August 17, 2003.

Medals

Silver

Women's Recurve Individual: Claudia Landaverde

Women's – 69 kg: Eva Dimas

Bronze

Men's Recurve Individual: José Ricardo Merlos
Men's Recurve Team: Cristobal Merlos, José Ricardo Merlos and Miguel Veliz

Results by event

Athletics

Boxing

See also
El Salvador at the 2004 Summer Olympics

References

Nations at the 2003 Pan American Games
P
2003